The financial secretary to the Treasury is a mid-level ministerial post in His Majesty's Treasury.  It is nominally the fifth most significant ministerial role within the Treasury after the first lord of the Treasury, the chancellor of the Exchequer, the chief secretary to the Treasury, and the paymaster general. However, the role of First Lord of the Treasury is always held by the prime minister who is not a Treasury minister, and the position of Paymaster General is a sinecure often held by the Minister for the Cabinet Office to allow the holder of that office to draw a government salary. In practice it is, therefore, the third most senior Treasury minister and has attended Cabinet in the past.

The incumbent as of October 2022 is Victoria Atkins. The position is shadowed by the shadow financial secretary to the treasury.

History

The role of Financial Secretary to the Treasury was created in 1711 and was known as the Junior Secretary to the Treasury to help deal with the increasing workload of the Senior Secretary to the Treasury. The first Junior Secretary to the Treasury is recorded as Thomas Harley who was appointed on 11 June 1711. The position has continued without any major interruption to the present day. Initially when the position of Senior Secretary to the Treasury became vacant not as the result of an election of change of government the Junior Secretary was usually automatically promoted to the senior role. Over time however, the roles of the Senior and Junior Secretaries began to diverge with the Senior Secretary post being used as a sinecure post for the Chief Whip, with no formal responsibilities to the Treasury. The Junior Secretary however remained a substantive position working in the Treasury. As such the Senior Secretary became known as the 'Parliamentary Secretary to the Treasury' while the Junior Secretary became known as the 'Financial Secretary to the Treasury' and the 'automatic' promotion from Junior to Senior ceased. While the exact date this change occurred is disputed it is agreed that by 1830 the distinction was complete.

In 1923 Sir William Joynson-Hicks became the–to date–only Financial Secretary to serve in the Cabinet due to the Prime Minister, Stanley Baldwin, also concurrently serving as Chancellor of the Exchequer.

In May 2010 as part of the ministerial reorganisation by the First Cameron ministry, the Financial Secretary was given the additional semi-official title of City Minister. This position was retained until April 2014 when following the promotion of Sajid Javid to Secretary of State for Culture, Media and Sport the portfolio of City Minister was moved from the Financial Secretary to the Treasury to the Economic Secretary to the Treasury.

Appointment to the position of Financial Secretary to the Treasury is often considered an important stepping stone in a politician's career; the four of previous five holders of the office have gone on to hold Cabinet-level positions.

Notable former Financial Secretaries to the Treasury include Lord Frederick Cavendish, Austen Chamberlain, Stanley Baldwin, Enoch Powell, Nigel Lawson, and Norman Lamont.

Current role
The current responsibilities of the Financial Secretary to the Treasury include Departmental responsibility for the Office for National Statistics, and the Royal Mint.  The Financial Secretary to the Treasury had Departmental responsibility for HM Customs & Excise until the merger with the Inland Revenue to form HM Revenue & Customs.

List of Financial Secretaries to the Treasury since 1830
see Secretary to the Treasury for earlier incumbents

Colour key (for political parties):

See also
Secretary to the Treasury
Chief Secretary to the Treasury

References

External links
British History Online List of Secretaries to the Treasury
Treasury Ministerial responsibilities

 
Lists of government ministers of the United Kingdom
Ministerial offices in the United Kingdom
1711 establishments in Great Britain